Johann Heinrich, Graf von Frankenberg (18 September 1726 – 11 June 1804) was Archbishop of Mechelen, Primate of the Low Countries, and a cardinal. He signed as de Franckenberg and as van Franckenberg.

Early life
Franckenberg was born in Groß-Glogau, Silesia, into an ancient family devotedly attached to the Habsburg monarchy of Austria, and which remained so after the conquest of Silesia by Frederick II of Prussia in 1740. Although he was the sole male heir of his family and assured of the protection of Empress Maria Theresa, he decided, when quite young, to become a priest. He attended the Jesuit college of his native city, went later to the University of Breslau, and thence to the German College at Rome, where he obtained the degrees of Doctor of Theology, and of Canon law, and was ordained priest on 10 August 1749.

On his return to Austria, he was made coadjutor to the Bishop of Görz in Carniola (1750–54), dean of the collegiate church of All Saints at Prague (1754), later of that of Saints Cosmas and Damian at Alt-Bunzlau in Bohemia (1756), and finally Archbishop of Mechelen and Primate of the Low Countries on 27 May 1759. In this exalted post, as in those he previously occupied, his life was an example of every private and public virtue.

It was not long before he was called on to defend the dignity and independence of his office against the Austrian government, which, even under Maria Theresa, was foreshadowing the reign of Joseph II. Despite his great devotion to Maria Theresa, he more than once resisted the improper exactions of her ministers, who wished him to grant Lenten dispensations according to their pleasure, and interfered in the most annoying manner in matters that pertained exclusively to ecclesiastical jurisdiction. He enjoyed, however, the personal favour of Maria Theresa, who sought to have him made Archbishop of Vienna, and in 1778 exerted herself to the uttermost to obtain for him the cardinal's hat.
 
The situation changed with the accession of Joseph II, a disciple of the "philosophers" and imbued with the principles of an "enlightened despotism". This emperor began that politico-ecclesiastical system, known as Josephinism, which meant substantially the absolute supremacy of the State. Each imperial encroachment on the rights of the Roman Catholic Church was opposed by Franckenberg with commendable fortitude, and yet in a gentle manner and with such respect for the civil authority that the cardinal brought upon himself the bitter reproaches of such unflinching zealots as the ex-Jesuits, Feller and Dedoyar.

His protests, however, were met by the government in an ill-humoured and disdainful way. It affected, indeed, to pay no attention to them. The most serious of the conflicts broke out over the General Seminary, founded at Leuven in 1786 by the emperor, and to which he ordered the bishops to send their students, closing at the same time their diocesan seminaries. The heretical teaching of the professors in this new institution, and the avowed purpose of using it as an instrument of ecclesiastical reform and a weapon against "ultramontanism", soon provoked among the students an agitation that ended in a general dispersion. The irritated emperor, forthwith, summoned the cardinal to Vienna to intimidate him by means, as he wrote to Kaunitz, "of those vigorous and unanswerable arguments of which you know so well how to make use".

Ill, bereft of his advisers, threatened with indefinite detention at a great distance from his diocese; reared, moreover, in those principles of respect for the sovereign power, which to us seem so exaggerated, the cardinal consented to sign a rather equivocal declaration, in which he stated that he was convinced of his obligation to conform to the imperial decrees "relative to the General Seminary", but reserved to himself the right to appeal to the emperor in cases where the eternal salvation of souls appeared to him to be imperiled.

On his return to the Austrian Netherlands, Franckenberg regained his former energy. He felt himself upheld by the ardent Catholic spirit of the nation, and announced to the government that his conscience would not permit of him to concur in the establishment of the General Seminary. Despite all threats, he thenceforth remained firm. The emperor called on him to express on his opinion on the doctrines then taught at the General Seminary, whereupon the cardinal condemned that teaching in his "Declaration," a document that created a profound impression throughout the Austrian Netherlands.

The country was already disturbed by insurrectionary movements, and the government was obliged to close the General Seminary. It was too late, however, to repress the rebellious agitation. The government sought, therefore, to make the cardinal responsible for it, and wished to place him under arrest. From his place of refuge, the cardinal protested against the accusation: "I take heaven and earth to witness", said he, "that I have had no share or influence whatever in this insurrection. The entire Netherlands will bear witness to this fact and do me justice in this respect." The government, finding it necessary to abandon the criminal process it had begun against the cardinal, exhibited a conciliatory temper.

In the meantime, however, the French Revolution broke out. The new administration found him friendly, and he was henceforth officially a member of the States-General. At the same time he held aloof from purely political discussions and confined himself to recommending political union. He received with submission and respect the re-establishment of the Austrian government, to which he had always been attached. On the arrival of the French he had to undergo new trials. He refused the pension the government offered him in compensation for the suppression of his revenue, declared his opposition to the oath exacted of the clergy, and finally was expelled from the Southern Netherlands (1797).

Retirement
He retired to Emmerich am Rhein in Prussia, where, aged, sick, and poor, he lived on the charity of his flock, and continued to warn them against those ecclesiastics who had taken the oath. His apostolic courage and his constancy in these trials elicited solemn eulogies from both Pope Pius VI and Pope Pius VII. In deference to the pope's request and to render possible the execution of the concordat, he resigned the Archbishopric of Mechelen on 20 November 1801.

Driven from Emmerich by King Frederick William III of Prussia at the insistence of the French government, which regarded him as a conspirator, he retired to Borken in the Prince-Bishopric of Münster (1801), and, after the suppression of this principality, to Breda, where he died. His courage, self-abnegation, and patience in the face of persecution and adversity make him one of the noblest figures of the Catholic episcopate during the 18th century.

Notes

1726 births
1804 deaths
People from Głogów
18th-century Roman Catholic archbishops in the Holy Roman Empire
Belgian cardinals
University of Breslau alumni
Cardinals created by Pope Pius VI